The Äkim (Kazakh: әкім, äkım) of Almaty is the chief authority in the city of Almaty. The position was established in 1992.

List

Äkıms of Almaty (1992–present)

See also 
List of Akims Astana City
Akim

References 

Almaty